Cheick Mohamed Chérif Doumbia (born 19 August 1991) is a Malian professional footballer who plays as a midfielder for Championnat National 2 club Bastia-Borgo. He is a former Mali international.

Club career
On 30 June 2014, Doumbia moved from Stade Malien to Ligue 2 side Brest, signing a two-year contract with an option for a further year. He was presented with a Brest jersey with number 21 and name "Cheick M.C." on the back.

On 15 January 2017, Doumbia joined Championnat National side CA Bastia on loan until the end of the season.

At the end of August 2017, Doumbia signed for newly formed Championnat National 2 side Bastia-Borgo.

International career
In January 2014, coach Djibril Dramé invited him to be a part of the Mali squad for the 2014 African Nations Championship. He played all three of Mali's matches at the first round of the tournament and helped the team to the quarter finals where they lost to Zimbabwe by two goals to one.

References

External links

1991 births
Living people
Sportspeople from Bamako
Association football midfielders
Mali international footballers
Malian footballers
Stade Malien players
Stade Tunisien players
FC Bastia-Borgo players
Stade Brestois 29 players
Ligue 2 players
Championnat National players
Championnat National 2 players
Championnat National 3 players
Tunisian Ligue Professionnelle 1 players
Malian expatriate footballers
Expatriate footballers in Tunisia
Malian expatriate sportspeople in Tunisia
Expatriate footballers in France
Malian expatriate sportspeople in France
2014 African Nations Championship players
21st-century Malian people
Mali A' international footballers